Elias Hossain is a retired Bangladeshi footballer who played as an attacking midfielder. He played for the Bangladesh national team from 1983 to 1989. He also captained the national team during the 1989 South Asian Games. Elias is also the only player from Gopalganj to play for the Bangladesh national team. He is currently working as an executive director for the  Bangladesh Football Federation.

Club career
In 1977, the Jubilee Rangers took on Friends Club, which was the Gopalganj First Division title deciding match. Elias Hossain played as a substitute for Jubilee Rangers in that match. Many star footballers of Dhaka including Kazi Salahuddin and Ashrafuddin Chunnu came to Gopalganj to play the match as, Jubilee Rangers lost 2–1 to Friends Club that day. Seeing the young midfielders technique, Abahani officials took him to Dhaka, to train with the club.

Although, Elias was not able to establish his position in the starting XI, he impressed Abahani coach Ali Imam, who later sent him to Azad Sporting Club in order to get game time, in 1981. After a year at Azad, Elias moved to falling giants Dhaka Wanderers Club, where he also played for a single season. In 1983, Elias got his big move to Dhaka Mohammedan SC, where he spent 8 years at. In 1986, Elias scored as Mohammedan defeated arch-rivals Abahani 2–0, in the Dhaka League title deciding match, thus, ending Abahani's aim for a fourth consecutive league title and break Mohammedan's 3 year title drought. In 1989, Elias was made Mohammedan's captain and lead the club until his retirement in 1991.

International career
Elias made his Bangladesh national football team debut, during the 1973 Merdeka Cup, in Malaysia for the first time wearing the national team jersey. On 5 April 1985, Elias scored his first international goal, which came in a 1–0 win over Thailand, during the 1986 FIFA World Cup qualifiers. During the 1985 South Asian Games Elias managed to score again as Bangladesh put 8 goals past Maldives. However, during the final of the SAFF Games that year, Elias missed his shot as Bangladesh lost to India, on penalties. Elias also missed an open net goal during the game, and was heavily criticized by fans and media later on.

During the 1989 South Asian Games, Elias captained Bangladesh as, they again took on India in the group stages. His midfield partner, Nurul Haque Manik helped Bangladesh take the lead, however, after a challenge from defender Rezaul Karim Rehan in the penalty box, Bangladesh conceded a late penalty. While protesting the decision, Elias pushed the referee in anger, leading to his ban from national football. After going through many complications, that game ended up to be Elias's last with the national team.

International goals
Scores and results list Bangladesh's goal tally first.

Bangladesh

Personal life
On 13 October 2020, Elias's mother Hasina Begum died at the age of 83.

Since 2012, Elias has been the executive director of the Bangladesh Football Federation. He involved with his hometown club Gopalganj Sporting Club, a club which was incepted in 2021. In 2016, he was involved in opening a football academy in his hometown Gopalganj.

Honours

Mohammedan SC
 Dhaka League = 1986, 1987, 1988–89
 Federation Cup = 1983, 1987, 1989
 Independence Cup = 1991

Awards and accolades
2013 − National Sports Award.

References

Living people
1962 births
Bangladeshi footballers
Bangladesh international footballers
Association football midfielders
Abahani Limited (Dhaka) players
Mohammedan SC (Dhaka) players
Asian Games competitors for Bangladesh
Footballers at the 1986 Asian Games
South Asian Games silver medalists for Bangladesh
South Asian Games bronze medalists for Bangladesh
South Asian Games medalists in football
People from Gopalganj District, Bangladesh
Recipients of the Bangladesh National Sports Award